Sequatchie County High School (SCHS) is a public high school in Dunlap, Tennessee, United States. It is part of the Sequatchie County School Board.

References

External links 
 

Schools in Sequatchie County, Tennessee
Public high schools in Tennessee